Faders Up 2 is a live album of the Belgian band Triggerfinger. The album was released on 18 May 2012, having been recorded during a concert in Amsterdam, Netherlands in November 2011.

Track list

Personnel
Ruben Block - lead vocals, guitar
Paul Van Bruystegem - bass guitar, backing vocals
Mario Goossens - drums, backing vocals

External links
Band's official website

2012 albums
Triggerfinger albums